The Irish Olympic Handball Association (IOHA) is a governing body of team or Olympic handball on the island of Ireland. It is a member of the European Handball Federation (EHF). Established in 1975, the IOHA is recognised by the Irish Sports Council, Olympic Council of Ireland, the European Handball Federation and the International Handball Federation (IHF) as the sole governing body for the sport of Olympic handball in Ireland and Northern Ireland.

Irish Men National League

Men's IOHA Cup

Women IOHA Cup

See also
 List of handball clubs in Ireland

References

|} Data sources: Dublin International HCClub Achievements;

External links
 
 many entries related to Irish Handball
 

 
Handball
European Handball Federation
Sports organizations established in 1975